The Tenby International School network is a group of international schools in Malaysia which was founded in 1960 and admits children aged 3–18. There are schools in Ipoh, Penang, Setia Alam, Miri, Iskandar Puteri and Selangor. A new campus at Kota Kemuning opened in September 2018.

References

Education in Malaysia
Iskandar Puteri